World and Time Enough is a 1994 independent gay-themed romantic comedy-drama written and directed by Eric Mueller and starring Gregory Giles, Matt Guidry and Kraig Swartz.

Cast

Plot
Narrated by their friend David (Swartz), World and Time Enough is the story of Mark (Guidry) and Joey (Giles). Mark is an HIV-positive art student who creates temporary "sculptures" on topics including AIDS, abortion and the Bush economy. Joey works as a garbage collector, picking up trash along the roadways. He sometimes brings home interesting items that he finds on the job.

Mark's mother was killed when he was a child, in a freak accident in a church when she was crushed by a large falling cross. Since that day, his father has been obsessed with building model cathedrals. Mark and his father are somewhat distant and out of touch and Mark reaches out to him through a series of phone calls, leaving messages on his father's answering machine. Unknown to Mark, his father has died alone in his home but hasn't yet been discovered.

Joey's relationship with his adoptive parents is also strained because of his father's issues with Joey's homosexuality. Although he remains close with his sister, Joey feels the need to seek out his birth parents through the adoption social service agency.

Mark discovers his father's body and in his grief he assumes his father's obsession with cathedral building. Rather than a model, however, Mark begins work on a full-size cathedral in a local open field.

Joey learns the identity of his birth parents, but also learns that they have died. He visits their gravesite and says the things there that he would have told them while they were alive.

Mark experiences a vision of his father, who tells him that he's making a mistake, to go home. Mark feverishly climbs the scaffolding and falls off it to the ground. Joey discovers him there.

Later, together, out of the scaffolds, surviving bits of Mark's sculptures and the things Joey's gathered, they build their own "cathedral."

Production

It was filmed on location in Edina and Minneapolis, Minnesota. The film was made with grants from the National Endowment for the Arts, the American Film Institute, and a local film organization. The final budget was about $60,000.

Reception

The film was generally well-received by critics, although having 2 heterosexual actors play romantic leads in an LGBTQ+ film was noted in reviews.

Awards

References

External links
 

1990s American films
1990s English-language films
1994 LGBT-related films
1994 films
1994 independent films
American LGBT-related films
American independent films
Films set in Minnesota
Films shot in Minnesota
HIV/AIDS in American films